Alexandrine Latendresse (born April 30, 1984) was the New Democratic Party Member of Parliament for Louis-Saint-Laurent and was elected in the 2011 Canadian federal election. She defeated former Minister of Intergovernmental Affairs Josée Verner of the Conservative Party. She had earlier run in Louis-Saint-Laurent in the 2008 federal election, but lost.

Latendresse introduced Bill C-419, which would require future officers of Parliament to be able to function in both official languages without the help of an interpreter.

Latendresse declined to run again in the 2015 election, saying the pace of parliamentary debate had lost its appeal for her. Daniel Caron, a former ambassador of Canada to Ukraine from 2008 to 2011, was acclaimed as the NDP candidate in the district shortly thereafter.

Early life and education
Latendresse was born in Montreal and had a career as a child actor, starring in advertisements in the 1980s that promoted cheese in Quebec. She then had several roles in various television series, including Watatatow and Virginie. She also participated in several films, including Montréal vu par..., La fête des rois, Soho, Aline and Le Jardin d'Anna.

She received a Bachelor of Arts in linguistics at Laval University. Latendresse was to undertake graduate studies in May 2011, but she agreed to postpone this decision until after the election.

Latendresse was named deputy critic for democratic reform in June 2011.

References

External links
 

1984 births
Actresses from Montreal
Actresses from Quebec City
Canadian actor-politicians
Canadian child actresses
Canadian film actresses
Canadian television actresses
Women members of the House of Commons of Canada
French Quebecers
Living people
Members of the House of Commons of Canada from Quebec
New Democratic Party MPs
Politicians from Montreal
Politicians from Quebec City
Université Laval alumni
21st-century Canadian politicians
21st-century Canadian women politicians